Secret Wedding is a 1989 Argentinian drama film directed by Alejandro Agresti.

The film won the Golden Calf for Best Feature Film award at the 1989 Netherlands Film Festival. The film wasn't shown in Argentina for 15 years until it was broadcast on Televisión Pública Argentina in 2004.

Plot
A man missing for 13 years returns to his village to find his past girlfriend.

Cast
  Floria Bloise as Doña Patricia
  Mirta Busnelli as Tota
  Tito Haas as Fermín
  Elio Marchi as Leandro
  Enrique Morales		
  Nathán Pinzón as Pastor
  Sergio Poves Campos as Pipi
  Carlos Roffé as Merello
  Ernesto Ciliberti
  Susana Cortínez
  Raul Santangelo
  Alfredo Noberasco
  Ernesto Arias
  Enrique Mazza as police officer
  Hugo Padula
  Ariel Chichizola
  Carlos Larrache

References

External links 
 

1989 films
1980s Spanish-language films
1989 drama films
Argentine drama films
1980s Argentine films